Héctor Arredondo Casillas (November 12, 1970 – November 16, 2014), was a Mexican television, film and stage actor. He worked with TV Azteca as an actor of telenovelas.

Personal life and death 
The actor was romantically linked with actress Carla Hernández, with whom he had his daughter Camila; He also had another daughter, Kia, from a previous relationship.

Arredondo was diagnosed with pancreatic cancer in September 2014. The actor died of the disease on November 16, 2014, four days after his 44th birthday. The news was confirmed by the press Department of Azteca, company with which he collaborated for 13 years.

Filmography

References

External links 

1970 births
2014 deaths
Mexican male film actors
Mexican male stage actors
Mexican male telenovela actors
Mexican male television actors
20th-century Mexican male actors
21st-century Mexican male actors
Male actors from Mexico City
Deaths from cancer in Mexico
Deaths from pancreatic cancer